The 1989 Battle of Amgala took place on 8 November 1989, when two POLISARIO mechanized columns launched a massive attack against Moroccan troops in the Amgala region, managing to cross the Moroccan Wall and advance twenty kilometers in direction to Smara, to finally retreat before Moroccan retaliation to their positions in the Free Zone (region).

It was the last military operation of the Western Sahara War until Operation Rattle in 1991.

See also
Sahrawi refugees

References

History of Western Sahara
Conflicts in 1989
Amgala 1989
1989 in Western Sahara
1989 in Morocco
November 1989 events in Africa